Pete Nash may refer to:

 Pete Nash (comics), creator of the British comic strip Striker
 Pete Nash (game designer), role-playing game designer